KDHE-LP (Academy Radio) was an independent radio station located in Spring Creek, NV and operated by the non-profit Spring Creek Christian Academy.

The station's license was cancelled by the Federal Communications Commission on March 5, 2021, due to having been off the air since at least August 19, 2019.

Description
The station's primary music genre was Christian Pop, but also had a wide variety of genres available for requesting at their website. The radio station was primarily run by students, with multiple shows including Squirrel Zone, Top 10 Christian Hits of the week, and more.

Competition
KDHE had five rival stations in the Elko area, that included 91.1 SOS Radio, 90.7 Pilgrim Radio, 88.7 Effect Radio, CSN.

External links
 

DHE-LP
Radio stations established in 2015
2015 establishments in Nevada
DHE-LP
Radio stations disestablished in 2021
2021 disestablishments in Nevada
Defunct radio stations in the United States
Defunct religious radio stations in the United States
DHE-LP